Marisa Christine Coughlan (born March 17, 1974) is an American actress and writer. Her first prominent role was a lead in Kevin Williamson's Teaching Mrs. Tingle (1999), followed by a role as Officer Ursula Hanson in the comedy Super Troopers (2001). She also had a recurring role as Melissa Hughes on the series Boston Legal.

Early life
Coughlan was born in Minneapolis, Minnesota. She graduated from Breck School, a small private school in nearby Golden Valley, Minnesota. When she moved to Los Angeles with her father, Daniel Merritt Coughlan, she enrolled at the University of Southern California. She studied abroad in Paris in 1995, and graduated with a Bachelor of Arts degree in French in 1996.

Career
Coughlan's first film appearance to gain mainstream attention was in Kevin Williamson's directorial debut Teaching Mrs. Tingle (1999), in which she co-starred alongside Katie Holmes and Helen Mirren. She was cast in the role after reportedly having been rejected for a role on Williamson's series Dawson's Creek. She followed this with a recurring role on the series Wasteland in 1999.

Other films she appeared in included Pumpkin (co-starring with Christina Ricci), a drama about sorority girls; New Suit, a satirical comedy about the inner workings of Hollywood; Super Troopers, playing Officer Ursula Hanson; and Freddy Got Fingered as Betty.

She had a recurring role on the television series Boston Legal as secretary Melissa Hughes in seasons two and three. In 2007, she starred as Jenny McIntyre in Lifetime Television's original series Side Order of Life.  In 2008–2009, she appeared on three episodes of the TV show Bones.
 
Coughlan began writing while she was pregnant and taking time off from acting. She wrote and produced her first pilot, Lost & Found for ABC in 2011. In 2014, she completed writing a comedy based on Peter and Wendy for NBC. In 2016, it was reported by Variety that Fox was developing a comedy series titled Pushing, written by Coughlan and produced by Greg Berlanti.

Personal life
In November 2008, Coughlan married childhood friend Stephen Wallack in a ceremony at a private estate in Pasadena, California. They have four children together. As of 2015 she lived in Deephaven, Minnesota, after several years in Studio City, California.

Filmography

Film

Television

References

External links

1974 births
Actresses from Minneapolis
American film actresses
American television actresses
Living people
University of Southern California alumni
Screenwriters from Minnesota
21st-century American women